The Accessible Boating Association is a waterway society and a registered charity number 295034 in Hampshire, England.

The Association aims to provide boating opportunities on the Basingstoke Canal for disabled people with access difficulties. The Association was founded in 1985 and was formerly known as "Boats for the Handicapped". It is a member of the National Community Boats Association.

The Association's boats have been specially designed to provide facilities for disabled passengers: 
Accommodation for disabled persons and their carers
Space for several wheelchairs
Extra wide ramps for access
Hydraulic lifts
a hospital-type bed for a severely handicapped person

There are different options available for day trips. A day trip on Dawn from Odiham allows a peaceful cruise to  a picnic lunch and a leisurely return through picturesque country stretches of the Basingstoke Canal, said by many to be one of the prettiest canals in the UK.

They offer two choices of day trip on Dawn: hiring the whole boat for 4 hours or more; or reserving seats on public trips that last around 2½ hours.

There are two choices of out and return route:

 West to King John's (Odiham) Castle near Greywell through the North Warnborough lift bridge to moor close to the castle just short of the limit of navigation and the adjacent winding (turning) hole. Note that this option may not be available when water levels are low.
 A longer distance East to Winchfield passing the picturesque Old Thatch Cottage before reaching Barley Mow wharf and the winding hole just beyond.

The season runs from April to October.

See also
Other charities providing boating opportunities for disabled people
Disabled Sailors Association
English Federation of Disability Sport
Nancy Oldfield Trust, Norfolk Broads
Seagull Trust, Scotland
Peter Le Marchant Trust, Leicestershire
List of waterway societies in the United Kingdom

References 

Disability organisations based in England
Disabled boating
Clubs and societies in Hampshire
Charities based in Hampshire
Parasports in England
Water sports in England